The list of ship launches in 1715 includes a chronological list of some ships launched in 1715.


References

1715
Ship launches